The discography of Jeru the Damaja, an American hip hop musician, consists of five studio albums, one extended play and nineteen singles. His most successful album to date is his sophomore album Wrath of the Math, which peaked at #35 on the Billboard 200 in 1996. Jeru's only song to date to chart on the Billboard Hot 100 is his debut single "Come Clean", which peaked at #88 in 1993.

Albums

Studio albums

Extended plays

Singles

Promotional singles

As featured performer

Music videos

References

Discographies of American artists
Hip hop discographies